Hamed Halbouni (born 1 January 1967) is a Syrian boxer. He competed in the men's flyweight event at the 1988 Summer Olympics.

References

External links
 

1967 births
Living people
Syrian male boxers
Olympic boxers of Syria
Boxers at the 1988 Summer Olympics
Sportspeople from Damascus
Mediterranean Games gold medalists for Syria
Mediterranean Games medalists in boxing
Competitors at the 1987 Mediterranean Games
Flyweight boxers